Katherine Elizabeth French  (born 11 February 1991) is a British modern pentathlete who won the gold medal at the 2020 Summer Olympics in Tokyo, Japan.

Personal life
French was born on 11 February 1991 in Meopham, near Gravesend, Kent. She was privately educated at the independent Cobham Hall School. She completed a degree in sports performance at the University of Bath, where she also trains at the Pentathlon GB High Performance Centre.

French is married and lives in Chapmanslade, Wiltshire.

Modern pentathlon
In 2013 French finished in tenth place in the individual event at both the World Championships in held in Kaoshiung, Taiwan and at the European Championships held in Drzonków, Poland. At the European Championships she also won gold medals in the women's team event, competing alongside Mhairi Spence and Samantha Murray, and in the women's relay event, with Murray and Katy Burke. At the World Championships French, Murray and Spence also won the gold medal in the team event.

At the 2014 World Modern Pentathlon Championships held in Warsaw, Poland, French won two silver medals. Competing with Freyja Prentice and Samantha Murray she was part of the women's team that finished second behind China and in the mixed relay event; French and Joe Evans finished second behind Justinas Kinderis and Laura Asadauskaitė of Lithuania.

She qualified for the modern pentathlon at the 2016 Summer Olympics by finishing eighth at the 2015 European Championships held in Bath. French was placed fifteenth after the first three events but missed only a single target during the combined run and shooting event to secure the top eight finish needed for Olympic qualification. At the same event she won a gold medal in the team event, competing alongside Samantha Murray and Freyja Prentice, who finished tenth and thirteenth in the individual event.

In 2016 she placed 5th at the Olympic games after a consistent performance throughout all events, including winning the riding event with a perfect clear round. 2017 saw her most successful season with a silver medal at World Cup 1 in Los Angeles and a gold medal at World Cup 2 in Cairo. Due to this success she achieved a world ranking high of number 2.

In 2018 French won the silver medal in the individual event at the European Championships held in Székesfehérvár, Hungary.  The following year, she repeated her silver medal-winning performance in the individual event and also won gold in the team event at the European Championships held in Bath, England.

In 2021 she won gold at the Tokyo 2020 Olympic Games, the first British competitor to win since Steph Cook took gold at the Sydney games in 2000. She also broke the Olympic record for overall points in the event.

French was appointed Member of the Order of the British Empire (MBE) in the 2022 New Year Honours for services to modern pentathlon.

References

External links
 

Living people
British female modern pentathletes
1991 births
Alumni of the University of Bath
People from Meopham
Modern pentathletes at the 2016 Summer Olympics
Modern pentathletes at the 2020 Summer Olympics
Medalists at the 2020 Summer Olympics
Olympic gold medallists for Great Britain
Olympic modern pentathletes of Great Britain
People educated at Cobham Hall School
Sportspeople from Gravesend, Kent
Team Bath pentathletes
Olympic medalists in modern pentathlon
English Olympic medallists
Members of the Order of the British Empire